Priscilla and the Umbrella is a 1911 American short silent comedy film directed by Frank Powell and Mack Sennett, starring Florence Barker and featuring Blanche Sweet.

Cast
 Florence Barker as Priscilla
 Joseph Graybill as Paul (as Joe Graybill)
 Edward Dillon as Harry
 Grace Henderson as The Mother
 William J. Butler as The Father
 Blanche Sweet as The Sister

Critical reception
A review in Motography found that the film's action maintained interest throughout its length. "The actors play with an extraordinary amount of zest," it said, "and this quality probably accounts in large measure for the success of the film."

See also
 Blanche Sweet filmography

References

External links

1911 films
1911 comedy films
1911 short films
Silent American comedy films
American silent short films
Biograph Company films
American black-and-white films
Films directed by Frank Powell
Films directed by Mack Sennett
American comedy short films
Films with screenplays by Frank E. Woods
1910s American films
1910s English-language films
English-language comedy films